This list of publicized titan arum blooms in cultivation is a partial listing of flowering events of the titan arum (Amorphophallus titanum) in cultivation.

Before 2000

2000-2009

2010 to 2019

2020 to present

Gallery

References

External links
List of Amorphophallus titanum Blooms, 1889 to 2008
Live feed of Rollins College Hauck Greenhouse Amorphophallus titanum bloom

Titan arum
Amorphophallus